Jürgen Udo Bockelmann (30 September 1934  – 21 December 2014), better known as Udo Jürgens, was an Austrian composer and singer of popular music whose career spanned over 50 years. He won the Eurovision Song Contest 1966 for Austria, composed close to 1,000 songs, and sold over 104 million records. In 2007, he additionally obtained Swiss citizenship. In 2010, he legally changed his name to Udo Jürgens Bockelmann.

He is credited with broadening German-language pop music beyond the traditional post-war "Schlager" (hit song) in the 1950s by infusing it with a modern pop appeal and French chanson style. His compositions and arrangements attracted fans of all ages. Until his death at age 80, he continued to fill venues in Germany, Austria, and Switzerland.

Career

In 1952, Udo Bolan, as he was called then, formed the Udo Bolan Quartet in Klagenfurt, Austria, appearing regularly at the Café Obelisk in Klagenfurt with Englishman Johnny Richards on drums, Klaus Behmel on guitar, and Bruno Geiger on Bass. The quartet played regularly at various dance and jazz venues and also broadcast on Radio Alpenland and the British Forces Radio network produced by Mike Fior.

In 1950, he won a composer contest organized by Austria's public broadcasting channel ORF with the song "Je t'aime". He wrote the 1961 worldwide hit "Reach for the Stars", sung by Shirley Bassey.

In 1964, Jürgens represented Austria for the first time at the Eurovision Song Contest 1964 with the song "Warum nur, warum?", finishing sixth. The UK participant, Matt Monro, was impressed with the melody and covered the song (with English lyrics by his manager Don Black) as "Walk Away", which reached number four in the UK Singles Chart and number 23 in the US Billboard Hot 100 chart.

Jürgens' song "Sag ihr, ich lass sie grüßen" came fourth in 1965's contest, and on his third try, he won the Eurovision Song Contest 1966 in Luxembourg with "Merci, Chérie", which became an English-language hit for Vince Hill, another cover by Monro, and one of Jürgens' most recognized compositions. Jürgens' version alone sold over one million copies, and he was awarded a gold disc by Deutsche Vogue in 1966.

In the following years, Jürgens wrote songs like "Griechischer Wein", "Aber bitte mit Sahne", "Mit 66 Jahren", and—one of his biggest successes—"Buenos Días, Argentina", which he performed together with the Germany national football team in 1978 in Argentinia.

In 1977, he invited The Supremes to appear as guests on his televised and recorded gala concert. The Supremes (Mary Wilson, Scherrie Payne, and Susaye Greene), who were on a brief farewell tour of Europe at the time, performed two of their own hits, "You Are the Heart of Me" and "You're My Driving Wheel", as well as a duet with Jürgens' "Walk Away" in English.

In 1979, he released a disco album entitled Udo '80, which spawned the hit single "Ich weiß was ich will". This song was also released as a 12" disco single in an extended remix for nightclubs.

Few people know that Udo Jürgens was an inspiration for Shepard Fairey to establish the label OBEY Clothing.

On 2 December 2007, the jukebox musical Ich war noch niemals in New York ("I've never been to New York") opened in Hamburg's Operettenhaus. It weaves songs by Jürgens into a familial storyline, similar to the treatment of ABBA songs in Mamma Mia!, the musical it succeeded at the venue.

Like Keith Richards, Jürgens is very famous in Argentine, where he has one of the biggest fan bases outside of German speaking countries.

Since 2015, Jürgens holds the worldwide-record as the artist with the longest presence in the charts ever—more than 57 years from his first entry 1958 till 2015. On December 16, 2022, a new album consisting of his legacies was released by the children. This reached #1 on the German charts on December 24. Thus, Jürgens has been in the German charts for more than eight decades.

Cover versions

"Merci, Chérie", whose original German lyrics were written by Thomas Hörbiger, has been translated or adapted into several languages and covered by dozens of artists in both vocal and instrumental recordings. These versions include:
 "Merci Chérie" by Claude Carrère and André Salvet (French)
 "Merci" by Vito Pallavicini (Italian)
 "Merci Cherie" by Baker Cavendish (English)
 "Merci Cherie" by Fred Bekky (Dutch)
 "Merci Chérie" by Al Sandström (Swedish)
 "Merci Chérie" by Gina Trandafirescu (Romanian)
 "Merci Cheri" by Andrzej Ozga (Polish)
Jürgens himself recorded many of the translations for international release, including a version in Japanese. More recent covers include Belinda Carlisle's 2007 recording of the French version.

In addition to recording Cavendish's "Merci, Chérie" lyric, Matt Monro covered five more Jürgens compositions, all with English lyrics (unrelated to the German ones), written by his manager Don Black. Four of these became closely associated with Monro (and were subsequently covered by Jürgens himself): 
 "Warum nur warum?" became "Walk Away" (a 1964 Top 40 hit in both the U.S. and UK)
 "Du sollst die Welt für mich sein" became "Without You" (a 1965 UK Top 40 hit)
 "Was ich dir sagen will" became "The Music Played" (1968)
 "Illusionen" became "If I Never Sing Another Song" (1977), which was later performed by Frankie Laine, Shirley Bassey, Sammy Davis Jr., and other entertainers.

A fifth Jürgens song, "In dieser Welt", became "Lovin' You Again", and in 1969, Matt Monro recorded both Spanish and English versions, the latter not released until August 2012. (Monro also recorded Spanish versions of "Walk Away" and "The Music Played"; all three Spanish lyrics were adapted for Monro from Don Black's versions by Leonardo Schultz, who also produced the Spanish recordings.)

In one of his last recording sessions, Bing Crosby covered an English version of Jürgens' "Griechischer Wein" called "Come Share the Wine", which also was written by Black. The song was released after Crosby's death in 1977 as the title track of a compilation album and was later recorded by Al Martino.

In 1979, Marty Robbins released an English version of "Buenos Dias Argentina" that became a latter-day standard for Robbins.

In the early 1990s, German thrash metal band Sodom released a 'metalized' cover of the boogie "Aber bitte mit Sahne".

In 2009, the German band Sportfreunde Stiller covered "Ich war noch niemals in New York" together with Jürgens on their MTV Unplugged concert in Munich.

Death

On 21 December 2014, Jürgens died of cardiac arrest in Münsterlingen, Switzerland, at the age of 80. Notably, in one of his later songs "Am Ufer" he sings about "having finally arrived" and in that song there is a line that says: "Am Ufer aus beschwingter Zeit liegt flimmern in der Luft; und voller Grenzenlosigkeit hör ich wie mich das Leben ruft" or in English: "At a shoreline of inspired time, there's trembling (fibrillation) in the air and with utter boundlessness I hear how life is calling me". 

With Austria's success at the 2014 Eurovision Song Contest, the first since Jürgens' success in 1966, Jürgens expressed his interest in performing in the interval of the next contest. With his death, the organisers of the 2015 contest in Vienna paid tribute to him with a tribute day in the "Eurovision Village" on 20 May and at the beginning of the Austrian national final broadcast live on ORF 1. At the contest's final, violinist Lidia Baich performed an excerpt of his winning song live on stage during the opening act.

Family
 His brother, Manfred Bockelmann (born 1 July 1943), is a painter.
 His son by first marriage, John Jürgens (born 20 February 1964), is a singer, actor and DJ.
 His daughter by his first marriage, Jenny Jürgens (born 22 January 1967), is an actress.
 His uncle, Werner Bockelmann (23 September 1907 – 7 April 1968), was mayor of Frankfurt am Main 
Udo Jürgens was related neither to the singer Andrea Jürgens nor to the actor Curd Jürgens.

Discography

 "Portrait in Musik" (1965)
 "Merci, Chérie" (1966, Eurovision Song Contest)
 "Chansons" (1967)
 "Portrait in Musik – 2. Folge" (1967)
 "Was ich dir sagen will" (1967)
 "Mein Lied für dich" (1968)
 "Udo" (1968)
 "Wünsche zur Weihnachtszeit" (1968)
 "Udo Live" (1969)
 "Portrait International" (1969)
 "Udo '70" (1969)
 "Udo '71" (1970)
 "Zeig mir den Platz an der Sonne" (1971)
 "Helden, Helden" (musical) (1972)
 "Ich bin wieder da" (1972)
 "Udo in Concert – Europatournee '72/'73" (1973)
 "International 2" (1973)
 "Live in Japan" (1973)
 "Udo heute" (1974)
 "Meine Lieder" (1974)
 "Udo '75" (1975)
 "Meine Lieder 2" (1976)
 "Udo Live '77" (1977)
 "Meine Lieder '77" (1977)
 "Lieder, die auf Reisen gehen" (1978)
 "Buenos Días Argentina" (football world championship) (1978)
 "Ein Mann und seine Lieder – Live" (1978)
 "Nur ein Lächeln" (1979)
 "Udo '80" (1979)
 "Meine Lieder sind wie Hände – Live" (1980)
 "Leave a Little Love" (1981)
 "Willkommen in meinem Leben" (1981)
 "Silberstreifen" (1982)
 "Udo Live – Lust am Leben" (1982)
 "Traumtänzer" (1983)
 "Hautnah" (1984)
 "Udo live und hautnah" (1985)
 "Treibjagd" (1985)
 "Deinetwegen" (1986)
 "Udo Live '87" (1987)
 "Das blaue Album" (1988)
 "Sogar Engel brauchen Glück" (best-of compilation including five remakes) (1989)
 "Ohne Maske" (1989)
 "Live ohne Maske" (1990)
 "Sempre Roma" (football world championship) (1990)
 "Das Traumschiff" (instrumental soundtrack) (1990)
 "Geradeaus" (1991)
 "Open Air Symphony" (1992)
 "Café Größenwahn" (1993)
 "Aber bitte mit Sahne" (hits compilation including a new song and two remakes) (1994)
 "140 Tage Café Größenwahn Tour 94/95" (1995)
 "Zärtlicher Chaot" (1995)
 "Gestern-Heute-Morgen" (1996)
 "Gestern-Heute-Morgen – Live '97" (1997)
 "Aber bitte mit Sahne 2" (hits compilation including eight remakes) (1998)
 "Ich werde da sein" (1999)
 "Mit 66 Jahren (Was wichtig ist)" (2000)
 "Mit 66 Jahren – Live 2001" (2001)
 "Es lebe das Laster" (2002)
 "Es werde Licht" (2003)
 "Es Lebe das Laster – Udo Live" (2004)
 "Jetzt oder nie" (2005)
 "Der Solo-Abend – Live am Gendarmenmarkt" (2005)
 "Jetzt oder nie – Live 2006" (2006)
 "Einfach ich" (2008)
 "Einfach ich – Live 2009" (2009)
 "Best Of" (including a remake live by MTV Unplugged) (2009)
 "Der ganz normale Wahnsinn" (2011)
 "Der Mann mit dem Fagott" (soundtrack to his own film) (2011)
 "Der ganz normale Wahnsinn – Live" (2012)
 "Mitten im Leben" (2014)
 "Udo Jürgens Live – Das letzte Konzert Zürich 2014 mit dem Orchester Pepe Lienhard" (new live album recorded at his last concert of his last tour, 7 December 2014, only two weeks before he died) (2015)
 "Merci, Udo!" (2016)
 "Merci, Udo! 2" (2017)

Selected filmography
Our Crazy Aunts (1961), as Pitt van Rees
Drei Liebesbriefe aus Tirol (1962), as Martin Hinterkirchner
Dance with Me Into the Morning (1962), as Max Kainz
Our Crazy Nieces (1963), as Pitt van Rees
Our Crazy Aunts in the South Seas (1964), as Pitt van Rees
Das Spukschloß im Salzkammergut (1966), as Udo
As himself
The Legs of Dolores (1957)
 (1961)
Hochzeit am Neusiedler See (1963)
 (1966)
Soundtrack
  (1976)
Film adaptations
  (2011) – Based on Udo Jürgens' autobiography
  (2019) – Musical, based on songs by Udo Jürgens

References

External links

Wolfgang Spahr: Casebook Udo Jürgens. Billboard, 26. März 1994
Excerpts from a thesis on Jürgens (2002) by Christian Mädler 
 

Udo Jürgens - Ich war noch niemals in New York Musical 

"tz.de"  Der verzweifelte Rettungsversuch: Billy Todzo alamiert per Handy den Notarzt, rennt zum ein paar hundert Meter entfernten Gemeindehaus, um einen dort öffentlich zugänglichen Defibrillator zu holen. Mit diesem tragbaren Gerät kann man dem Patienten einen Elektroschock geben – die einzige Möglichkeit, um lebensgefährliches Kammerflimmern zu beenden (siehe unten). „Die meisten Gemeinden in der Schweiz haben einen Defi“, erklärt Bürgermeisterin Rosmarie Obergfell. Aber leider zeigt Udo keine Reaktion.

1934 births
2014 deaths
20th-century Austrian male singers
21st-century Austrian male singers
Eurovision Song Contest entrants for Austria
Eurovision Song Contest entrants of 1964
Eurovision Song Contest entrants of 1965
Eurovision Song Contest entrants of 1966
Eurovision Song Contest winners
United Nations High Commissioner for Refugees Goodwill Ambassadors
Musicians from Klagenfurt
Officers Crosses of the Order of Merit of the Federal Republic of Germany
Burials at the Vienna Central Cemetery